Zhao Wei (Chinese: 赵伟; born 3 February 1989) is a Chinese football player who currently plays for China League Two side Dandong Tengyue.

Club career
In 2010, Zhao Wei started his professional footballer career with Liaoning Tiger in the China League Two. In February 2011, Xu transferred to China League Two side Harbin Yiteng. In the 2011 China League Two campaign he would be part of the team that won the division and promotion into the second tier. He would go on to be a member of the squad as they moved up divisions and gained promotion to the Chinese Super League. He would eventually make his Super league debut for Harbin on 13 April 2014 in a game against Shanghai Shenxin in a 1-0 defeat.

In June 2016, Zhao transferred to China League Two side Shenzhen Renren. In March 2017, Zhao transferred to fellow League Two side Heilongjiang Lava Spring on loan. The following season the move would be made permanent.

Career statistics 
Statistics accurate as of match played 31 December 2020.

Honours

Club
Harbin Yiteng
China League Two: 2011

Heilongjiang Lava Spring
China League Two: 2017

References

External links
 

1989 births
Living people
Chinese footballers
Footballers from Dalian
Zhejiang Yiteng F.C. players
Heilongjiang Ice City F.C. players
Chinese Super League players
China League One players
China League Two players
Association football midfielders